John Thomson Mason may refer to:

 John Thomson Mason (1765–1824), American jurist and Attorney General of Maryland in 1806
 John Thomson Mason (1787–1850), American lawyer, United States marshal, Secretary of Michigan Territory from 1830 through 1831
 John Thomson Mason, Jr. (1815–1873), U.S. Representative from Maryland, son of John Thomson Mason (1765–1824)

See also 
 John Mason (disambiguation)